Ciraparantag (aripazine) is a drug under investigation as an antidote for a number of anticoagulant (anti-blood clotting) drugs, including factor Xa inhibitors (rivaroxaban, apixaban and edoxaban), dabigatran, and heparins (including fondaparinux, low molecular weight heparins (LMWH), and unfractionated heparin).

Medical uses
Ciraparantag significantly reverses anticoagulation induced by a therapeutic dose of edoxaban within 10 minutes following injection. This return to normal haemostasis persists over 24 hours following a single intravenous dose of the drug. In addition to edoxaban, it also reverses the actions of LMWH and dabigatran.

Pharmacology

Mechanism of action
According to in vitro studies, the substance binds directly to anticoagulants via hydrogen bonds  and charge-charge interactions  from or to various parts of the molecule:

Chemistry
Ciraparantag consists of two L-arginine units connected with a piperazine containing linker chain.

See also 
 Andexanet alfa
 Idarucizumab
 Prothrombin complex concentrate
 Vitamin K

References 

Amino acid derivatives
Antidotes
Guanidines